Tiruverkadu Devi Karumariamman Temple is a Hindu temple in Tiruverkadu, a suburb of Chennai, in Tamil Nadu, India. The temple is maintained and administered by the Hindu Religious and Charitable Endowments Department of the Government of Tamil Nadu.

Deity 

The deity of the temple is Karumariamman. Its idol is in the sanctum sanctorum in a graceful form with all Parasakthi features. There is also a shrine for Karumariamman idol with the idol made of wood. She is called Wooden Idol Amman.

Significance 

There was an anthill. People worshipped as Goddess. She appeared in the dream of a devotee and asked him to build a temple for Her. When the anthill was about to be destroyed they saw the Goddess in swayambu form. As she was not in the womb of a mother, she is called as one not from the womb (Karuvil Illatha Karumari).

Tank

There is a tank outside the temple. It is known as sacred ash tank.

Sunday
Sunday is celebrated as the day of Karumari. One can happily witness the scene of sun rays falling on the head of Devikarumari twice a year.

References

External links 

Hindu temples in Chennai
Hindu temples in Tiruvallur district
Mariamman temples